Pulau is a 2023 Malaysian supernatural horror film. It stars Alif Satar, Amelia Henderson, Sanjna Suri and Ms. Puiyi. Its story follows a group of friends who stay on a deserted island and awaken a vengeful spirit.

Plot 
The vacation of a group of youngsters turns into an endless horrifying nightmare after a losing bet forces them to spend a night at a deserted island. As they stumble upon a mysterious abandoned village there, they accidentally break an old spell that was placed to restraint an antagonizing spirit trapped in the island. One by one, they are made to suffer the gripping and gruesome consequences of their mistakes, infuriating an evil creature that needs human blood to stay alive. The only way out is in the hands of a girl who desperately needs to use her supernatural gift to untangle an unsettling history connected to a tainted cross-cultural love story.

Cast 
 Amelia Henderson as Kat
 Alif Satar as Ben
 Ikmal Amry as Khai
 Joey Leong as Lili
 Sanjna Suri as Yus
 Evie Feroza as Moli
 Jazmy Juma as Dauz
 Vikar as Mark
 Namron as Azhan
 Harris Annuar as Desmond
 Sabronzo as Yaya
 Siew Pui Yi as Kitty
 Mark O'Dea as Hero
 Alexander Henderson as Toni

Special appearance 
 Wan Hanafi Su as Tok Penghulu
 Cedric Loo as Chen An
 Eddie Chong as Eddie

Controversy 
The release of its trailer attracted controversy in Malaysia due to its perceived sexual nature, including criticism from Communications Minister Fahmi Fadzil and the Malaysian Consultative Council for Islamic Organization. The Film Censorship Board of Malaysia had approved it for screening in 2022, although some scenes cut from the film were used in the trailer. It was banned in the state of Terengganu.

References

External links 

 

2023 horror thriller films
Malaysian supernatural horror films
Film controversies in Malaysia
Film censorship in Malaysia
Films set on islands
Films shot in Malaysia
Films set in Malaysia
2023 controversies
Malaysian ghost films
Malay-language films